Death Walks the Streets is a 2010 comic book limited series based on an unproduced screenplay for a film of the same title. The comic is a prequel, set three years prior to the timeline in the screenplay.

Publication history
Death Walks the Streets was first released by The Scream Factory on June, 26 2008. Issue #0 was released in a standard, retail edition featuring a Werewolf cover, and a Wizard World Chicago 2008 convention exclusive, limited to 333 pieces. The Wizard World version was available at their Chicago event, which was held from June 26–29, 2008.

On October 10, 2008, news hit that Fangoria Comics had been reinstated, and that Death Walks the Streets would continue under the Fangoria Graphix line, published by Fangoria.

Further news arrived on October 31, as release plans for both digital and print editions of the title were announced.

Due to continued internal restructuring of the Fangoria brand, Fangoria Graphix was once again shuttered in 2009 after releasing only one new issue of the Death Walks the Streets series.

On February 19, 2010, rumors began swirling that The Scream Factory had been reinstated after a cover for a new issue of Death Walks the Streets surfaced online bearing the company's trade dressing.

The return of The Scream Factory was confirmed on May 10, 2010 as Fearnet reported that the company had partnered with Panelfly to bring their comics into digital formats for the iPhone, iPad, and iPod Touch.

Plot synopsis
Set three years before DWTS I, an Organization Soldier named Michael Labou leads a crew that includes his longtime friends Danielle and Malcolm. Charged with tracking down and capturing a person wanted by The Organization, it's anything but business as usual on the streets of New Marshall.

Vampires - Demons - Zombies - Werewolves - The Mob.

Reception
Ain't it Cool News stated that the zero issue contained "a pretty good story" along with "a great premise." In regards to Issue #1 they said that "there's something beneath the surface and just off in the periphery that oozes evil and the anticipation for the big satanic hoof to drop is palpable" along with declaring that "DEATH WALKS THE STREETS is a welcome addition to a line of comics that does printed horror right."

Eric Anderson of The Pullbox called the series "smart horror at  finest."

Film adaptation
The comic book is a prequel to a possible film.

Death Walks the Streets in popular culture
Napalm Death guitarist Mitch Harris can be seen wearing a Death Walks the Streets T-shirt in the music video for the song "On the Brink of Extinction" from the album Time Waits for No Slave.

Notes

References

External links
 
 Death Walks the Streets at ComicSpace
 Death Walks the Streets at Facebook
 James Zahn on Scream Factory's Death Walks the Streets, Newsarama, June 12, 2008
 Death Walks the Streets Issue 0 Review, Horror-movies.ca, July 11, 2008
 Issue 0 Convention Exclusive Review, Midnightsliceofpie.com, July 4, 2008
 Death Walks the Streets 0 Review, Flamesrising.com, July 3, 2008
 Death Walks the Streets #0, Thepullbox.com, June 30, 2008
 Death Walks the Streets Issue #1 Cover Art, Reelcomix.com, July 6, 2008

Comics based on films
Unproduced screenplays